Hobe may refer to:

People
 Hobe (family), a German aristocratic family also influential in Denmark
 Jobé, a subgroup of the Jaega Native American tribe of Florida
 Hobe Ferris (1877–1938), American Major League Baseball player
 Hobe Morrison, named an honoray life member of the Directors Guild of America - see 14th Directors Guild of America Awards
 Engelbrecht H. Hobe, builder of the E. H. Hobe House-Solheim, a house on the United States National Register of Historic Places

Other uses
 Hobe, an alternate name for Tamsui District, Taiwan, and the surrounding area
 Battle of Tamsui or Hobe, an 1884 victory of the Qing dynasty over the French